Eugen Simion (25 May 1933 – 18 October 2022) was a Romanian literary critic and historian, editor, essayist and academic. 

Born in Chiojdeanca, Prahova County, the son of two farmers, Simion completed his secondary education at the Saints Peter and Paul High School in Ploiești. He then studied philology at the University of Bucharest, and made his professional debut as a literary critic in 1960, collaborating with the journals Tribuna and Gazeta literară. With his first book, Proza lui Eminescu, published in 1964, he was awarded the literary criticism prize of the Uniunii Scriitorilor (the Romanian Writers' Union). The same year he started working in his alma mater, first as an assistant, later as a lecturer, and from 1990 as a professor. He also held courses on Romanian culture and civilisation at the Sorbonne University between 1970 and 1973. 

Simion's body of work includes numerous monographs, essays, curation of anthologies as well as over 3,000 published articles and studies. A full member of the Romanian Academy since 1992, he served as president of the organization for two consecutive mandates, from 1998 to 2006, when he was nominated President of the Philology and Literature Department of the Academy, a role which he served until his death.

References

1933 births
2022 deaths
People from Prahova County
University of Bucharest alumni
Academic staff of the University of Bucharest
Academic staff of Paris-Sorbonne University
Mihai Eminescu scholars
Romanian literary critics
Romanian literary historians
Romanian essayists
Romanian publishers (people)
Members of the Romanian Academy of Sciences
Titular members of the Romanian Academy
Presidents of the Romanian Academy
Grand Crosses of the Order of the Star of Romania
Recipients of the Order of the Republic (Moldova)
Burials at Bellu Cemetery